The Brioche is a painting completed in 1870 by French artist Édouard Manet. Done in oil on canvas, the work depicts a brioche loaf resting on a table. It is in the collection of the Metropolitan Museum of Art. 

Manet was inspired to paint it after a painting of a brioche by 18th-century artist Jean Siméon Chardin was donated to the Louvre in Paris. In Manet's work the brioche is accompanied by peaches and plums. It is singular among Manet's still lifes for its formality, and mark the last time he would paint such an elaborate tabletop composition.

References

1870 paintings
Paintings by Édouard Manet
Paintings in the collection of the Metropolitan Museum of Art
Still life paintings